Mount Forget is located on the border of Alberta and British Columbia. It was named in 1925 after Amédée E. Forget.

See also
List of peaks on the British Columbia–Alberta border

References

Two-thousanders of Alberta
Two-thousanders of British Columbia
Canadian Rockies